No Ennui is Mrs. Fun's third album, from 1995. It was produced by Victor DeLorenzo, and recorded by Michael Hoffman at Joe's Recording Studio, in Milwaukee, Wisconsin. Like all of their albums produced through 1998, it was self-released. The music is a bass-heavy, groove-based free jazz.

The record features guest artists k.d. lang, singing background vocals on "Daughtera" (which was dedicated to Sun Ra), and Amy Ray and Emily Saliers, singing background vocals on "Gossip".

Track listing
 "Love You Loud" (DeLorenzo/Connie Grauer, Kim Zick)
 "Daughtera" (Grauer)
 "Lulu's Walk" (Grauer)
 "Why Are Words So Different" (Foyne Mahaffey/Grauer)
 "Trinity" (Kathryn Korniloff/Zick)
 "Opportunity Lane" (DeLorenzo/Grauer)
 "Black Box" (Grauer)
 "Epistrophy" (Thelonious Monk/Kenny Clarke)
 "Ennui" (Mahaffey)
 "Gossip" (DeLorenzo, Grauer, Zick, Jim Eannelli)

Personnel 

 Connie Grauer - keyboards, vocals, chimes, accordion, glockenspiel, toy piano
 Kim Zick - drums, percussion, vocals,
 Michael Hoffman - guitar
 Allen Johnson - trumpet
 Jeff Pietrangelo - trumpet
 Dave Matsen - tenor saxophone
 Juli Wood - baritone saxophone
 Malcolm Michiles - scratching
 Robyn Pluer - vocal (spoken word)
 Eric Segnitz - violin
 Paul Gmeinder - cello
 Foyne Mahaffey - castanets
 k.d. lang, Dayna Kurtz, Paula Cabor, Micki Korb, Claire Morkin, Paul Cebar, Paul Scher, Wesley Savick, Rob Gjersoe, Emily Saliers, Amy Ray - background vocals
 Victor DeLorenzo - producer
 Michael Hoffman - engineer
 Tamar Zick - cover art

Mrs. Fun albums
1995 albums
Self-released albums